Anjilaq (also Romanized as Anjīlāq and Anḩīlāq) is a village in Kuhpayeh-e Gharbi Rural District, in the Central District of Abyek County, Qazvin Province, Iran. As of 2006 census, its population was 557, in 168 families.

References 

Populated places in Abyek County